Kristen Anne Bell (born July 18, 1980) is an American actress and singer. Beginning her acting career by starring in stage productions while attending the Tisch School of the Arts at New York University, she made her Broadway stage debut as Becky Thatcher in the comedy musical The Adventures of Tom Sawyer and appeared in a Broadway revival of The Crucible the following year. She later appeared in the action thriller film Spartan (2004) and received praise for her performance in the television drama film Gracie's Choice (2004).

Her first major role was the title character in the teen noir drama television series Veronica Mars (2004–2007), receiving critical acclaim and a Saturn Award for Best Actress on Television for her performance. She reprised the eponymous role in the 2014 film and the 2019 revival. During her time on Veronica Mars, Bell starred as Mary Lane in the musical film Reefer Madness: The Movie Musical (2005), a reprise of the role she had played in the New York musical of the same name. 

Bell starred as Elle Bishop in the superhero drama series Heroes from 2007 to 2008. She voiced the titular narrator in the teen drama series Gossip Girl, reprising the role in the 2021 sequel. Bell also starred as Jeannie van der Hooven, the female lead on the Showtime comedy series House of Lies. She starred in the lead role of Eleanor Shellstrop on the critically acclaimed NBC comedy series The Good Place, receiving a Golden Globe Award nomination for her role. In addition, Bell portrayed the lead role in streaming series The Woman in the House Across the Street from the Girl in the Window.

In film, she had her major breakout film role as the title character in Forgetting Sarah Marshall (2008). She has since appeared in a number of comedy films, including Couples Retreat (2009), When in Rome (2010), You Again (2010), The Boss (2016), Bad Moms (2016), and A Bad Moms Christmas (2017). Bell garnered further recognition for voicing Princess Anna in the Disney animated films Frozen (2013), Ralph Breaks the Internet (2018), and Frozen II (2019).

Early life and family
Bell was born on July 18, 1980, in Huntington Woods, Michigan, a suburb of Detroit, where she was raised. Her mother, Lorelei (née Frygier), is a registered nurse, and her father, Tom Bell, works as a television news director in Las Vegas, Nevada. Her parents divorced when she was two years old. Bell has two stepsisters from her father's second marriage, and three stepsisters and a stepbrother from her mother's second marriage. Her mother is of Polish descent, and her father has German, Scottish and Irish ancestry.

Bell stated that she did not like her first name at the age of four. Bell's mother convinced her to go by her middle name, Anne, instead; she used the name Annie until high school.

Just before her first year of high school, Bell's parents decided to remove her from the public school system. She attended Shrine Catholic High School in nearby Royal Oak, where she took part in the drama and music club. Before attending Shrine, she attended Burton Elementary School and Norup Middle School (now known as Norup International School), a part of the Berkley School District. During her time at the school, she won the starring role in the school's 1997 production of The Wizard of Oz, as Dorothy Gale, and also appeared in productions of Fiddler on the Roof (1995), Lady, Be Good (1996), and Li'l Abner (1998). In 1998, the year she graduated, Bell was named the yearbook's "Best Looking Girl" by senior class vote.

Shortly after her high school graduation, Bell moved to New York City to attend New York University's Tisch School of the Arts, studying musical theater. In 2002, during her senior year, Bell left a few credits shy of graduating to take a role in the Broadway musical version of The Adventures of Tom Sawyer.

Career

1992–2003: Early work
In 1992, Bell went to her first audition and won a dual role as a banana and a tree in a suburban Detroit theater's production of Raggedy Ann and Andy. Her mother had established her with an agent before Bell was 13, which allowed her to appear in newspaper advertisements for several Detroit retailers and television commercials. She also began private acting lessons. In 1998, she appeared with an uncredited role in the locally filmed movie Polish Wedding.

In 2001, Bell left New York University to play a role as Becky Thatcher in the short-lived Broadway musical of The Adventures of Tom Sawyer. That same year, she made her credited film debut in Pootie Tang. Her one line in the film was cut, and her appearance exists only as a scene shown during the credit sequence. Additionally, she auditioned for the television series Smallville for the role of Chloe Sullivan, which was eventually won by Allison Mack.

In 2002, she appeared in the Broadway revival of The Crucible with Liam Neeson, Angela Bettis and Laura Linney. Bell then moved to Los Angeles in 2002 because of her friendship with writers Kevin Murphy and Dan Studney, and appeared in a handful of television shows as a special guest, finding trouble gaining a recurring role in a television series. Bell said she "tested like eight times and booked nothing and every show [she] tested for got picked up", including auditions for Skin and a Norm Macdonald series.

In 2003, Bell appeared in FX's "The Shield," season 2, episode 1, which aired on January 7, 2003.  She also co-starred in the film "The King and Queen of Moonlight Bay," playing the role of Alison, a 17-year old girl who travels to Arizona to reconnect with the father that abandoned her family when Alison was only 5 years old.

2004–2006: Veronica Mars and other roles
In 2004, Bell earned acclaim for her starring role in the Lifetime television film Gracie's Choice, which received one of the network's highest ratings. She made her debut in a theatrically released film with David Mamet's action thriller Spartan, as Laura Newton, the kidnapped daughter of the U.S. president, acting alongside Val Kilmer. Bell also guest-starred on the HBO period drama series Deadwood, in a two-episode story arc ("Bullock Returns to the Camp" and "Suffer the Little Children").

At 24, she won the role of the title character in the UPN noir drama series Veronica Mars, which was launched in the fall of 2004. Created by Rob Thomas, the series starred Bell as the seventeen-year-old anti-establishment high school student and private detective. Bell drew on the parallels between the character of Veronica and her own life, since Bell's parents had divorced and her best friend had also died. The series earned acclaim from critics. Bell's performance earned her the Saturn Award for Best Actress on Television and a nomination for the TCA Award for Individual Achievement in Drama, among numerous others. Some critics asserted that her performance was overlooked, and deserved consideration for a Primetime Emmy Award.

Aside from working on Veronica Mars, Bell starred in Reefer Madness: The Movie Musical, reprising the role she played in the short-lived 2001 Off-Broadway musical. The musical was a spoof of the 1936 exploitation film of the same name. Reefer Madness: The Movie Musical debuted on the Showtime network on April 16, 2005. Also in April, Bell starred as Gracie in Fifty Pills, an entry for the Tribeca Film Festival. She appeared in a short independent film called The Receipt and the horror film Roman, which was directed by her Crucible co-star Angela Bettis. Released on August 11, 2006, Pulse starred Bell as the lead Mattie. A remake of the Japanese horror film Kairo, the film grossed US$27.9 million worldwide but garnered negative response from critics. Frank Scheck of The Hollywood Reporter commented, "despite the starring presence of Kristen Bell, [the] young actress has far less interesting material to work with here than she does as [the character] 'Veronica Mars.'"

2007–2011: Film breakthrough and Gossip Girl
Veronica Mars continued on UPN for a second season; for the third season, the show was renewed and appeared on the newly created The CW. On January 19, 2007, CW Entertainment President Dawn Ostroff announced that while she was pleased with the gradual improvement of Veronica Mars ratings, the series would be put on hiatus after February sweeps to air a new reality series, Pussycat Dolls Present. On May 17, 2007, Ostroff announced the cancelation of the series. A two-hour series finale aired in the United States on May 22, 2007, and on June 11, 2007, Thomas officially announced in an email to TV Guide Michael Ausiello that Veronica Mars had been canceled by the CW. A Veronica Mars feature film and comic book series continuation had been discussed, and for a short time there was talk of another collaboration between Bell and creator Thomas that would be unrelated to the Veronica Mars series.

Following the cancelation of Veronica Mars, Bell voiced interest in appearing on Heroes because she was a fan. On July 29, 2007, during a train ride back to Los Angeles from the San Diego Comic-Con with Heroes actors Zachary Quinto and Masi Oka, and writers from the series, the writers had mentioned that if she "ever want[ed] to come on Heroes, give us [writers] a call," to which Bell said she would "love to". Meanwhile, there were discussions about a role on Lost, but Bell turned down the role of Charlotte Staples Lewis. Bell portrayed Elle Bishop on Heroes, a "mysterious young lady" with an "awesome power". She did not have to audition for the role of Elle, who made her first appearance in an October 2007 episode, and appeared in twelve episodes during the run of the series. The casting of Bell, Heroes creator Tim Kring explained, "was not easy to pull off", but because of the large ensemble cast of the series and multiple story arcs, "we found a way to jump into a small window in [Bell's] schedule." Bell lent her voice to the CW series Gossip Girl: she voiced the title character in every episode of the series, appearing in person only for a surprise cameo in the final episode, portraying herself.

Shortly after the cancelation of Veronica Mars in early 2007, Bell filmed on location in Hawaii for a starring role as the title character in the Judd Apatow comedy Forgetting Sarah Marshall. She regarded the improvisational comedy in the film as "a lovely experience". The film, written by and also starring Jason Segel, was released theatrically on April 18, 2008, and greatly increased Bell's profile. Bell lent her voice and likeness to the video game Assassin's Creed, which was released in November 2007 for consoles and April 2008 for the PC. Bell reprised her role of Lucy in Assassin's Creed II, released in November 2009, and again in Assassin's Creed: Brotherhood, released in November 2010. In the spring of 2006, she finished filming the Star Wars-themed comedy Fanboys. Director Kyle Newman received additional funding to shoot new scenes, but the busy schedules of the actors only allowed for filming in September 2007. As a result, the release was delayed until January 14, 2008. Bell also starred in the 2009 comedies Serious Moonlight, alongside Meg Ryan, and Couples Retreat, which chronicles four couples who partake in therapy sessions at a tropical island resort. Jason Bateman played her husband. She also provided the voice for Cora in Astro Boy. On March 31, 2008, Bell began shooting the Mark Steven Johnson-written Disney film When in Rome on location in Rome and New York; the film was released in 2010. Bell reprised her role as Sarah Marshall for a cameo appearance in the film Get Him to the Greek, a spin-off sequel from Forgetting Sarah Marshall, released June 4, 2010.

Bell co-starred alongside singers Christina Aguilera and Cher in the backstage musical film Burlesque, which was released in November 2010. She also had a cameo appearance alongside Anna Paquin in the slasher horror film Scream 4, which was released on April 15, 2011.

2012–2019: Frozen and The Good Place
In 2012, Bell starred in the family drama film Big Miracle. She has also appeared in the music video for "Madder Red" by Brooklyn experimental rock band Yeasayer. Bell portrayed Mary Magdalene in The Truth & Life Dramatized Audio New Testament Bible, a 22-hour, celebrity-voiced, dramatized audio adaptation of the New Testament that uses the RSV-CE translation.

Bell starred as Jeannie van der Hooven, the female lead on the Showtime comedy series House of Lies, which premiered on January 8, 2012. The series ended on June 12, 2016. Bell appeared in a supporting role in the science-fiction comedy Safety Not Guaranteed (2012). She starred in the drama film The Lifeguard, written and directed by Liz W. Garcia, which began filming in July 2012 and was released in August 2013. She also voiced Anna in Frozen, which was released on November 22, 2013. In 2013, for multiple episodes, Bell played Ingrid de Forest, an Eagleton City Councilwoman, on Parks and Recreation.

On March 13, 2013, it was confirmed that a Veronica Mars film would finally be coming to fruition. Bell and series creator Rob Thomas launched a fundraising campaign to produce the film through Kickstarter and attained the $2 million goal in less than ten hours. The main cast members of the series all reprised their roles in the feature film. Production of the film took place during summer 2013, and it was released theatrically and on video-on-demand on March 14, 2014.

In September 2014, Bell starred with her husband, Dax Shepard, in a commercial for the Samsung Galaxy Tab S. It was so popular (with over 20 million YouTube views) that they did another for the holiday season. The ad agency McKinney was behind both. In 2016, Bell voiced the sloth Priscilla in the animated comedy film Zootopia, and starred as Claire in the comedy film The Boss. Bell starred as Kiki in the 2016 comedy film Bad Moms, a role she reprised in the 2017 sequel, A Bad Moms Christmas. In 2016, Bell began starring as Eleanor Shellstrop in the NBC comedy series The Good Place. For her performance, she received a nomination for the Golden Globe Award for Best Actress – Television Series Musical or Comedy, the TCA Award for Individual Achievement in Comedy, and the Critics' Choice Television Award for Best Actress in a Comedy Series, among numerous others.

Also in 2017, she appeared in the biographical comedy-drama The Disaster Artist, the action comedy CHiPs and the comedy How to Be a Latin Lover. In November 2017, she played a housewife (with Dax Shepard as her husband) preparing for a Christmas party in Sia's music video for "Santa's Coming for Us".

In 2018, she began hosting the web series Momsplaining with Kristen Bell, with episodes airing on the Ellen DeGeneres video platform Ellentube. In the series, Bell gives new and expecting mothers tips about motherhood. The title of the series is a pun on the commonly used term "mansplaining". Bell later had the leading role in the Netflix comedy-drama film Like Father. She also voiced the character of Jade Wilson in the animated comedy film Teen Titans Go! To the Movies and reprised her voice role as Princess Anna in the animated comedy sequel film Ralph Breaks the Internet.

On September 20, 2018, Hulu confirmed that Bell would reprise her role of Veronica Mars in an 8-episode fourth season of the drama series Veronica Mars, which would premiere in July 2019. In 2019, she again reprised her role of Princess Anna in the video game, Kingdom Hearts III and the sequel, Frozen II which was released on November 22, 2019. Bell served as host and executive producer on the Disney+ docuseries Encore!, which premiered in November 2019. She made her directorial debut with the eighth episode of the fourth season of The Good Place. The series concluded after its fourth season, airing its final episode in January 2020. At the 25th Critics' Choice Awards, Bell received the #SeeHer Award, which recognizes women who "push boundaries on changing stereotypes and acknowledge the importance of authentic portrayals of women across the entertainment landscape".

2020–present 
In 2020, Bell published the children's book The World Needs More Purple People, which she co-wrote with Benjamin Hart. Also in 2020, Bell voiced Molly Tillerman in the Apple TV+ animated musical comedy series Central Park, which reunited her with Frozen co-star Josh Gad and Bad Moms co-star Kathryn Hahn. Central Park received a two-season order from Apple and the series premiered on May 29, 2020. In June 2020, it was announced that Bell, who is white, would no longer voice the biracial character of Molly. The role would be re-cast with a black or mixed race actress, with Bell voicing a new role.

In 2021, Bell produces and voices a lead character in the Amazon Prime Video animated musical pre-school series Do, Re, & Mi. She also returned to narrate as the titular character of the HBO Max teen drama series Gossip Girl, a soft reboot and sequel to the 2007–2012 series of the same. Bell also starred alongside Kirby Howell-Baptiste as a pair of housewives who created a multi-million dollar coupon scam in the comedy film Queenpins. The film was released to Paramount+ on September 10, 2021.

Her miniseries The Woman in the House Across the Street from the Girl in the Window was released on Netflix on January 28, 2022.

Bell also appeared in 2 episode of The Tiny Chef Show and serves as the show's executive producer.

In the media
In 2006 and again in 2013, Bell was selected "World's Sexiest Vegetarian" on PETA's yearly poll. She was placed 68 on Maxim's 2005 "Hot 100" list, 11 in Maxims 2006 "Hot 100" list, and 46 in Maxims 2007 "Hot 100" list in which she was stated to have "single-handedly saved The CW from becoming the worst network ever". In 2006, Maxim also placed Bell at the top of the "Fall TV's Criminally Sexy Investigators" List. In 2008, she was ranked 59 on AskMen's Top 99 Women of 2008 List. Reflecting on her admitted popularity with "geeks", Bell was voted the fourth-sexiest woman on TV by the staff at Wizard magazine.

Bell stated she never thought of herself as womanly because "I always play and look and act 10 years younger than I am." However, she said, "Something magical happened when I turned 25—I looked in the mirror and was like, 'You might not get carded for an R-rated movie anymore. Like I didn't have a little stick figure anymore." Bell has said that many of her characters are tomboys because she was "not homely enough to play the nerdy girl and not nearly pretty enough to play the pretty girl".

Bell has been associated with the idea that "nerdy is the new cool", and she explained, "what was previously perceived as nerdy is now viewed as original. What I like about nerdiness, geekiness, is it doesn't really matter what you're into—it just means you're not a follower." She has also said, "I love nerds. Comic-Con junkies are the tastemakers of tomorrow. Isn't that funny? The tables have turned." Vanessa Juarez of Entertainment Weekly commented that Bell's roles on Veronica Mars, Heroes and as a Star Wars fanatic in Fanboys have "solidif[ied] her placement at the center of the geek universe," while Rodney Rothman stated, "I guess she's cornered the market on losers." Bell's work is often compared to Sarah Michelle Gellar's portrayal of the title character on the television series Buffy the Vampire Slayer. Frank Scheck of The Hollywood Reporter stated that Bell was "arguably the television successor [to Gellar's portrayal of Buffy] when it comes to fighting bad guys." Bell is sometimes confused with Lauren Conrad from The Hills. "Yeah, sometimes fans yell, 'Hey, Lauren' to me, but usually from a distance," said Bell.

Despite "new celebrity" status, Bell claimed that she was not concerned because "no one ever recognizes me anyway". She has said that her friend Hayden Panettiere is more famous than she is and attracts more attention; as Bell explained, "I hang out with Hayden quite a bit—they never take pictures of me. I just step to the side, and I push myself in front of her when she wants to get out of it, or put her in the car."

Bell was a recurring guest on The Late Late Show with Craig Ferguson, appearing in interviews as well as sketches. On The Late Late Show, she shows a humorous hostility towards Craig Ferguson's robot skeleton sidekick Geoff Peterson, claiming that she had wanted to be Ferguson's sidekick on his show and taking it upon herself to cut Peterson down every chance she gets. Both Bell and Peterson appeared with Ferguson during the five Late Late Show episodes filmed in France.

In January 2011, it was announced that Bell would be the new face of Neutrogena.

In 2014, Bell posed nude for the May issue of Allure magazine – alongside Jenna Dewan, Minnie Driver, and Nia Long.

In April 2019, Bell was featured on the cover of Entrepreneur magazine's April–May issue. In the article, she discussed her snack bar company, This Saves Lives, which donates its sales to help feed malnourished children around the globe. In November 2019, Bell and Idina Menzel, who play sisters in Disney's Frozen franchise, received neighboring stars—Bell's was the 2681st and Menzel's was the 2682nd—on the Hollywood Walk of Fame.

Personal life

Relationships and family

In 2007, Bell ended a five-year relationship with former fiancé Kevin Mann. She later told Complex magazine that dating "makes me want to vomit. And not out of grossness—OK, a little bit out of grossness, but just nerves... I've always been a serial monogamist."

In late 2007, Bell began dating actor Dax Shepard, who is also from Metro Detroit. The couple announced their engagement in January 2010. They decided to delay marriage until the state of California passed legislation legalizing same-sex marriage. They co-starred in the 2010 film When in Rome, the 2012 film Hit and Run, and the 2017 film CHiPs. After section 3 of the Defense of Marriage Act was ruled unconstitutional by the Supreme Court on June 26, 2013, Bell asked Shepard to marry her through Twitter, which he accepted. They were married at the Beverly Hills County Clerk's Office on October 16, 2013. They have two daughters born in 2013 and 2014.

Beliefs, interests, and charity work

At age 11, Bell became a vegetarian. In an interview with PETA, Bell stated, "I have always been an animal lover. I had a hard time disassociating the animals I cuddled with—dogs and cats, for example—from the animals on my plate, and I never really cared for the taste of meat. I always loved my Brussels sprouts!". By 2012 Bell had become vegan with Shepard after watching the documentary Forks Over Knives. During her first pregnancy, she returned to eating dairy products and eggs, however. 

During her time in Michigan, Bell fostered animals from the Michigan Humane Society, and she now supports the San Diego-based Helen Woodward Animal Center. Bell often attends fundraisers for the American Society for the Prevention of Cruelty to Animals and other non-profit organizations dedicated to protecting animals. She has had several dogs, including a Welsh Corgi-Chow Chow mix named Lola, a Welsh Corgi-Chihuahua mix named Shakey and a black Labrador Retriever named Sadie, who was 11 years old when she was rescued from Hurricane Katrina and adopted by Bell in 2005.

Bell has stated she is non-religious and identifies as a humanist. She and her husband Dax Shepard are pro-vaccination. She practices the Transcendental Meditation program, stating: "I really enjoy powering down for 20 minutes because it's like shutting off light switches in my brain".

Bell showed support for the Writers Guild of America in the writers' strike, appearing in the picket lines in December 2007, stating, "the writers are just looking for some fairness". 

Bell and other Veronica Mars cast members, including Ryan Hansen, are involved with the charity Invisible Children, Inc. The goal of the organization is to create awareness of the plight of Northern Ugandans who are caught in the midst of a civil war between the government and Joseph Kony's Lord's Resistance Army.

Bell supported and campaigned for Barack Obama during the 2008 United States presidential election. Along with Rashida Jones, she visited college campuses in Missouri to discuss the candidates and encourage voter registration.

In 2013, Kristen Bell, along with actors Ryan Devlin, Todd Grinnell, and Ravi Patel, founded the granola bar company This Bar Saves Lives to help fight malnutrition. The business donates food aid in the form of nutrition packets to children in Haiti, South Sudan, Ethiopia, and Somalia. Since its launch, the company has donated more than 10 million packets as of February 2019.

In 2014, Bell launched a Prizeo campaign offering fans a chance to win a date with her in return for donating to Invisible Children, Inc. In 2018, Bell participated in a television advertisement for bone marrow donations, specifically the Gift of Life Marrow Registry. Her actions resulted in several matches that are documented on the Gift of Life website. Bell won a 2020 Webby Special Achievement Award.

In 2023, Bell revealed that she had taken up Brazilian jiu-jitsu and was training under Cesalina Gracie in mother-daughter classes alongside her daughter.

Mental health
In May 2016, Bell stated that she has received treatment for depression and anxiety. She said, "It's important for me to be candid about this so people in a similar situation can realize that they are not worthless and that they do have something to offer."

In an interview with Jimmy Kimmel in August 2018, Bell discussed why she wears scuba gloves while swimming. She stated that she fears the sensation of touching things with water-immersed, wrinkled fingers, otherwise known as "pruney fingers". The gloves have allowed her to swim with her children without fearing touching them.

Entrepreneurship
In 2019, Bell and her husband founded the company Hello Bello that markets plant-based baby care products said to be environmentally friendly and affordable. As of 2021, Hello Bello's estimated annual revenue was $26.1 million a year with 104 employees. In 2020, she also partnered to start Happy Dance, a line of vegan CBD products such as eye cream and hand moisturizers.

Filmography

 Spartan (2004)
 Reefer Madness (2005)
 Pulse (2006)
 Forgetting Sarah Marshall (2008)
 Fanboys (2009)
 Couples Retreat (2009)
 Astro Boy (2009)
 When in Rome (2010)
 Burlesque (2010)
 You Again (2010)
 Hit and Run (2012)
 Frozen (2013)
 Veronica Mars (2014)
 Frozen Fever (2015)
 The Boss (2016)
 Bad Moms (2016)
 A Bad Moms Christmas (2017)
 Olaf's Frozen Adventure (2017)
 Ralph Breaks the Internet (2018)
 Teen Titans Go! To the Movies (2018)
 Like Father (2018)
 Frozen II (2019)
 Queenpins (2021)
 The Woman in the House Across the Street from the Girl in the Window (2022)
 The People We Hate at the Wedding (2022)
 Paw Patrol: The Mighty Movie (2023)

Awards and nominations

References

External links

 
 
 
 

1980 births
Living people
Former Roman Catholics
20th-century American actresses
21st-century American actresses
Actresses from Detroit
American child actresses
American film actresses
American former Christians
American humanists
American musical theatre actresses
American people of German descent
American people of Irish descent
American people of Polish descent
American people of Scottish descent
American stage actresses
American television actresses
American video game actresses
American voice actresses
American web series actresses
People from Huntington Woods, Michigan
Tisch School of the Arts alumni